The rover fireflies (Photinus) are a genus of fireflies (family Lampyridae). They are the type genus of tribe Photinini in subfamily Lampyrinae. This genus contains, for example, the common eastern firefly (P. pyralis), the most common species of firefly in North America.

Male Photinus beetles emit a flashing light pattern to signal for females. Illegitimate receivers, such as female Photuris beetles, identify these signals and use them to locate the male Photinus, attract them with deceptive signals, and eat them.

Systematics
The closest living relative of the rover fireflies is not yet determined with certainty. In morphology, they resemble their predators, the Photurinae, but they are quite certainly not at all closely related as fireflies go. Rather, the genus Ellychnia is either the closest relative of Photinus, or might even be included in it. Ellychnia are notable for having lost the ability to produce light again, and like the ancestors of all fireflies, communicate with pheromones only. It might thus be warranted to remove some species from Photinus and assign them different genera.

The genus Pyropyga is also a close relative, though it is certainly not as close as Ellychnia. This group makes up the core of the tribe Photinini, and in fact it seems warranted to restrict the tribe to these genera, but more research is still needed, in particular with regard to Photinus and Ellychnia, as the relationship of their type species ("Photinus pallens" and Ellychnia corrusca) remains completely unknown, with the latter also suspected to be a cryptic species complex. Tropical species of Photinus are also not well studied.

Selected species
 Photinus australis Green, 1956
 Photinus carolinus Green, 1956 noted for synchronous flashing
 Photinus consanguineus LeConte, 1852
 Photinus concisus Lloyd, 1968
 Photinus floridanus Fall, 1927
 Photinus fuscus
 Photinus harveyi Buck, 1947
 Photinus pallens (Fabricius, 1798) – Jamaican Firefly
 Photinus punctulatus LeConte, 1852
 Photinus pyralis – common eastern firefly, big dipper firefly
 Photinus tanytoxis Lloyd, 1966

See also
 List of Photinus species

References

Further reading

 

Lampyridae
Lampyridae genera
Bioluminescent insects
Taxa named by François-Louis Laporte, comte de Castelnau